Langman may refer to:

People 
Harrie Langman (1931–2016), Dutch politician
Ida Kaplan Langman (1904–1991), Russian-born, United States botanist
Laura Langman (born 1986), New Zealand international netball player
Neil Langman (born 1932), retired English footballer
Nicholas Langman (born 1960), officer for the British secret service organisation MI6
Peter F. Langman (born 1960), American counseling psychologist and author
Ron Langman, South Australian photographer, businessperson and entrepreneur
Steven Langman, chairman and co-founder of the Rhône Group, the private-equity firm

Places 
Langman, a community in Springwater, Ontario, Canada
Langman Reserve, in the Adelaide foothills, South Australia

Other 
Langman baronets, a title in the Baronetage of the United Kingdom

See also

Lanagan
Lanegan
Lang Meng
Långban
Langmai
Langmeing
Langtan (disambiguation)
Languyan
Lanzmann
Lanzmann
Laungmin
Lawangan (disambiguation)
Lawngmin
Lengthman
Long Man
Longman
Longman & Co
Longmans